The 2021–22 UC Riverside Highlanders men's basketball team represented the University of California, Riverside in the 2021–22 NCAA Division I men's basketball season. The Highlanders, led by second-year head coach Mike Magpayo, played their home games at the on-campus Student Recreation Center Arena in Riverside, California, and competed as members of the Big West Conference.

Previous season

UCR finished 14–8, including an 8–4 record in conference play, during Magpayo's first season at the helm in 2020–21. After finishing third in the regular-season Big West Conference standings, the Highlanders defeated Hawaiʻi in the quarterfinals of the Big West tournament before being eliminated in the semifinals by UC Irvine. Their .636 winning percentage on the season was UCR's best single-season mark since the program transitioned to Division I in 2001.

Preseason
Prior to the season, the future of the men's basketball program was placed into doubt, as UC Riverside's leadership were considering cutting the university's entire athletics department in response to financial strain caused by the COVID-19 pandemic. However, in May 2021, the university announced that they had decided against eliminating athletics and will continue competing at the NCAA Division I level in all sports, thus saving the men's basketball program from extinction.

Roster
For the second straight season, over half of UC Riverside's roster consists, curiously, of players who are from either Australia or New Zealand.

Source:

Schedule and results
On November 11, the Highlanders upset Pac-12 school Arizona State on the road, 66–65. As time expired in the game, forward J. P. Moorman II sank a buzzer-beating three-pointer from past half-court to stun the Sun Devils in what a USA Today opinion piece called "one of college basketball's shining moments" and "perhaps the shot of the year".

|-
!colspan=12 style=| Exhibition

|-
!colspan=12 style=| Non-conference regular season

|-
!colspan=12 style=| Big West regular season

|-
!colspan=12 style=| Big West tournament

Sources:

Notes

References

UC Riverside Highlanders men's basketball seasons
UC Riverside Highlanders
UC Riverside Highlanders men's basketball
UC Riverside Highlanders men's basketball